Faust: The Second Part of the Tragedy is the second part of the tragic play Faust by Johann Wolfgang von Goethe. It was published in 1832, the year of Goethe's death.

Only part of Faust I is directly related to the legend of Johann Faust, which dates to at latest the beginning of the 16th century (thus preceding Marlowe's play). The "Gretchen" subplot, although now the most widely known episode of the Faust legend, was of Goethe's own invention. In Faust II, the legend (at least in a version of the 18th century, which came to Goethe's attention) already contained Faust's marriage with Helen and an encounter with an Emperor. But certainly Goethe deals with the legendary material very freely in both parts.

Acts

Act I

 Graceful area. Faust, bedded on flowery turf, weary, restless, seeking sleep. Dusk. Ghost circle, floating moves, graceful little figures.

The first act opens with an appeal by Ariel to forgive Faust and ease the cares of his suffering.

 Hall of the Throne. State Council in anticipation of the emperor. Trumpets. Servants of all kinds, beautifully dressed, step forward. The emperor ascends the throne, to his right the astrologer.

The first act sees Mephistopheles (playing the role of a fool) saving the imperial finances of the Emperor – and so the Holy Roman Empire – by money creation, introducing the use of paper money instead of gold to encourage spending (and economic recovery).

 Spacious room with side chambers, decorated and dressed up for the masquerade.

This is by far the most extensive section of the first act, describing the Florentine carnival from the perspective of Goethe, above all based on Antonio Francesco Grazzini's Tutti i trionfi (1559) – a collection of contemporary "songs and hard lifts". A parade of Florentine notables, including Dante and Gianni Schicchi, pass by.

 Lustgarten, morning sun. Faust, Mephistopheles, decent, not remarkable, according to custom, dressed, and both knees exposed.

The "Emperor of Thumb" (to use a devilish term of Mephistopheles) describes how much he enjoyed the recent celebrations, and wants more "dergleichen Scherze" (5988). The Emperor appears and blesses the newly introduced paper money from Mephisto, which is adorned with pictures of Simon Magus. The Emperor begins to understand its meaning and to squander it, as do his advisors. Goethe here satirizes the introduction of paper money during the French Revolution, with various advisors possibly representing Danton, Sieyès and other figures.

 Dark gallery. Faust. Mephistopheles.

Faust enters the "realm of the mothers" – variously described as the depths of the psyche or the womb – in order to bring back the "ideal form" of beauty for the Emperor's delight. In this case, the ideal forms are Helen of Troy and her lover Paris. Faust summons their spirits from Hades, but the emperor and the male members of his court criticize Paris's appearance, while the women of the court criticize Helen's appearance. Faust falls in love with Helen. In a fit of jealously toward Paris, who is now abducting Helen, Faust destroys the illusion and the act ends in darkness and tumult.

Act II
Mephistopheles transports the unconscious Faust into his old study. Mephistopheles, donning Faust's robe once again, resumes his conversation with the freshman, who is now a cynical baccalaureus. The Homunculus, an artificial human being created by Wagner, Faust's former famulus, by means of an alchemical process, leads Faust and Mephistopheles to the "Classical Walpurgisnacht", where they encounter gods and monsters from Greek antiquity. Faust, still searching for Helen, is led by the sybil Manto into the Underworld. Mephistopheles, meanwhile, meets the Phorkyads or Phorcydes (another name for the Graeae), three hideous hags who share one tooth and one eye between them, and he disguises himself as one of them. Guided by the sea-god Proteus, the Homunculus is initiated into the process of becoming fully human, but his glass flask shatters, and he dies.

Act III
The third act begins with Helen's arrival at the palace of Menelaus in Sparta, accompanied by women, who, as in Classical drama, constitute the chorus. The hideous Phorkyas appears at the hearth, and warns Helen that Menelaus means to sacrifice her and her attendants. Distraught at this new knowledge, Helen implores Phorkyas to save them. Phorkyas transports Helen and the chorus to Faust's fortress, where Helen and Faust declare their love for each other. After defeating Menelaus' army, Faust proclaims the pastoral beauty of the Arcadian countryside.

The scene changes in time and space: a range of rocky caverns, with a shadowy grove extending to the foot of the rocks. Phorkyas, now Faust and Helen's attendant, explains to the newly-woken chorus that during the past interval Faust and Helen have had a spirited son named Euphorion, who charms all with his beauty and gift for music. The wild Euphorion, becoming increasingly bold in his flight, falls to his death (in allusion to Icarus), whereupon the sorrowful Helen disappears in a mist to Hades (in allusion to the legend of Orpheus). The chorus of women, undesirous of joining their mistress in the Underworld, revert to nature, which they extol in songs of praise. As the act ends, Phorkyas is revealed to be Mephistopheles in disguise.

Act IV
In the fourth act, Faust finds himself taken away from Arcadia to a mountain top in Germany. Watching a cloud, that is separating into two parts, he recognizes in one part Helen and in the other Gretchen. The cloud with the form of Helen moves eastward, while the cloud of Gretchen rises heavenward. Then Mephistopheles, who has left behind his Greek appearance, joins Faust again. Mephistopheles strikes up a geognostic dispute about the genesis of terrestrial surface and especially the mountain region of this scene. Thereafter Faust states as his new higher purpose, that he wants to reclaim new land. Behind his desire stands the idea to control the elements or even to submit nature. Subsequently Faust focuses on controlling the sea, from which he reclaims new ground by dams and drainage ditches. But a war breaks out between the Emperor and a rival Emperor, whereby Faust's plans are interrupted. Mephistopheles introduces the three mighty men consisting of Bullyboy, Grab-quick and Hold-tight ("Raufebold", "Habebald", "Haltefest"), that should help to oppress the revolt and implement Faust's ambitious project. With the assistance of the three mighty men Faust achieves the victory for the Emperor. The three mighty men reveal dubious behaviours as looters, that cast a long shadow over their future services. As a reward for his military service Faust gets a district at the beach to administer.

Act V
An indefinite interval of time has passed since the end of the previous act, and Faust is now an old but powerful man favored by the king. Using dikes and dams to push back the sea, Faust has built a castle on the reclaimed land. Upon seeing the hut of an old peasant couple (Baucis and Philemon) and a nearby chapel, Faust becomes irritated that these two structures do not belong to him, and orders to have them removed. Mephistopheles overinterprets Faust's orders by murdering the old couple. The personification of Care breathes upon Faust's eyes, and he becomes blind. Upon disclosing his plans to better the lives of his subjects, motivated perhaps out of guilt, he recognizes the moment of sheer bliss which he would seek to prolong and drops dead. Mephistopheles believes Faust has lost his wager and tries to claim his soul. Angels suddenly appear, dropping rose-petals on the demons, who flee from the burning petals. Mephistopheles, however, stands his ground, and, under the aphrodisiac influence of the roses, lusts after the angels, who meanwhile make off with Faust's soul.

The scene abruptly changes to a wilderness inhabited by holy anchorites: "Mountain-gorges, Forest, Rock, Desert". Pater Profundus discloses the parable of nature, which is a harbinger of divine love. The angels bearing Faust's soul appear in heaven. After the enraptured Doctor Marianus extols the Eternal Feminine, the virgin Mary, Mater Gloriosa, appears from on high. Three biblical holy women, Magna Peccatrix (the Great Sinneress, Luke 7:36), Mulier Samaritana (the Samaritan woman, John 4), and Maria Aegyptiaca (Acta Sanctorum), plead for Faust's soul, while Una Paenitentium (previously Gretchen), also pleading for grace, offers to lead the reborn Faust into the higher spheres of heaven. Mater Gloriosa grants her wish.

The Chorus Mysticus (mysticus = related to the mysteries) ends the drama:
All of the transient,
Is parable, only:
The insufficient,
Here, grows to reality:
The indescribable,
Here, is done:
Woman, eternal,
Beckons us on.

In addition to the Christian motifs, the final scene makes references to an initiation into the ancient mysteries of Isis, in which the initiated learned the mysteries of the goddess Isis by the "epopteia". The "epopteia" is a nonverbal as well as "indescribable" (12108) process, that is associated with the sense of sight. Accordingly, Faust wants to see the mystery of Mater gloriosa:
Mightiest empress of the world,
Let me, in the blue
Pavilion of the sky unfurl'd,
Thy mystery view!
Höchste Herrscherin der Welt!
Lasse mich, im blauen,
Ausgespannten Himmelszelt
Dein Geheimniß schauen. (11997–12000)

Moreover, Faust labels Mater gloriosa as "the heaven's Queen" (11995) and "goddess" (12100) as in Apuleius' "The Golden Ass" (an important text source for the contemporary access to ancient mysteries); the protagonist is invoking the goddess Isis by those titles. With the title "goddess" forming a big contrast to Catholic and Protestant beliefs, Apuleius shows Isis as "mother of all Nature ... whose sole divinity is worshipped in differing forms, with varying rites, under many names, by all the world."

In the overall context of the story, this closing scene of initiation into the mysteries by Isis completes a series of motifs that started in Faust I with Doctor Faust's first appearance. Here we see the popular motif of a veiled Isis, who was also identified as goddess and mother of nature:
Mysterious, even in broad daylight,
Nature won't let her veil be raised:
What your spirit can't bring to sight,
Won't by screws and levers be displayed.
Geheimnißvoll am lichten Tag
Läßt sich Natur des Schleyers nicht berauben,
Und was sie deinem Geist nicht offenbaren mag,
Das zwingst du ihr nicht ab mit Hebeln und mit Schrauben. (672–675)

Goethe's statements about Faust II 
In the context of Act III:
I never doubted that the readers for whom I effectively wrote would grasp the principal significance of the portrayal straight away. It is time that the impassioned dispute between classicists and romantics should finally be reconciled. The principal thing is that we should properly cultivate ourselves; the source from which we do so would not matter, if we did not have to fear the possibility of miscultivation by appealing to false models. For it is certainly a broader and purer insight into and around Greek and Roman literature to which we owe our liberation from the monkish barbarism of the period between the fifteenth and sixteenth centuries. Is it not from this high level that we can learn to appreciate everything in its true physical and aesthetic value, both what is oldest and what is newest?

– Goethe's letter to K. J. L. Iken September 27, 1827 (translation of Rüdiger Bubner)

Rather in the context of Act III:
"Yet, ... it all appeals to the senses, and on the stage would satisfy the eye: more I did not intend. Let the crowd of spectators take pleasure in the spectacle; the higher import will not escape the initiated, as has been the case with the 'Magic Flute', and other things beside."

– Conversations with Goethe by Johann Peter Eckermann January 25, 1827 (translated by John Oxenford)

In the context of Act IV "The Mothers! Mothers! nay, it sounds so strange." (6216–6217):
"I can reveal to you no more [...] except that I found, in Plutarch, that in ancient Greece mention was made of the Mothers as divinities. This is all that I owe to others, the rest is my own invention. Take the manuscript home with you, study it carefully, and see what you can make of it."

– Conversations with Goethe by Johann Peter Eckermann January 10, 1830 (translated by John Oxenford)

"But, in the second part, there is scarcely anything of the subjective; here is seen a higher, broader, clearer, more passionless world, and he who has not looked about him and had some experience, will not know what to make of it."

– Conversations with Goethe by Johann Peter Eckermann February 17, 1831 (translated by John Oxenford)

See also
 Gustav Mahler's Eighth Symphony sets the text of the last scene of Faust II as its concluding movement.

Notes

External links
 
 
 

1832 plays
Epic poems in German
2
Books published posthumously
Tragedy plays